Steve Jarvin (born 27 March 1960) is a sailor from Sydney, Australia. who represented his country at the 1996 Summer Olympics in Savannah, United States as crew member in the Soling. With helmsman Matt Hayes and fellow crew member Stephen McConaghy they took the 12th place.

References

Living people
1960 births
Sailors at the 1996 Summer Olympics – Soling
Olympic sailors of Australia
Sailors from Sydney
Australian male sailors (sport)
20th-century Australian people